Ethiopic Church refers to a Christian church whose traditional liturgy is in the Ge'ez language, also known as Ethiopic.

There are four such churches:
Ethiopian Orthodox Tewahedo Church
Eritrean Orthodox Tewahedo Church
Ethiopian Catholic Church
Eritrean Catholic Church